The term Lukka lands (sometimes Luqqa lands), in Hittite language texts from the 2nd millennium BC, is a collective term for states formed by the Lukka people in south-west Anatolia (modern-day Turkey). The Lukka were never subjugated long-term by the Hittites, who generally viewed them as hostile. It is commonly accepted that the Bronze Age toponym Lukka is cognate with the Lycia of classical antiquity (8th century BC to 5th century AD).

Origins

The earliest known reference to the Lukka is from an inscription at Byblos dated to 2000 BCE, citing "Kukun, son of the Lukkan." It is understood to have an Anatolian context. Bryce suggested a Luwian connection:

Mosetto comments that Lucania is named after the Lucca without opining on their ultimate origins.  Melchert suggested "the term "Lukka" might have applied to a specific region in the southwest of Anatolia, inhabited by Luwian-speaking peoples but without clearly defined boundaries and with no overall political organization as well as any other regions, or all regions collectively, with a predominantly Luwian population" as the older term "Luwiya" disappeared from historical memory.

Location

There is no consensus on the precise location of the Lukka lands. Bryce believed they extended "from the western end of Pamphylia, through Lycaonia, Pisidia and Lycia." Keen thought it was "evident that the Lukka Lands extended as far north as  Millawanda/Miletos; the border, such as existed, was probably along the Maiandros valley" and that [the Lukka] were driven out of Caria by the Leleges at the dawn of the 1st millennium BCE.

History

Soldiers from the Lukka lands fought on the Hittite side in the famous Battle of Kadesh (c. 1274 BC) against the Egyptian Pharaoh Ramesses II. A century later, the Lukka had turned against the Hittites. The Hittite king Suppiluliuma II tried in vain to defeat the Lukka. They contributed to the collapse of the Hittite Empire.

The Lukka are also known from texts in Ancient Egypt as one of the tribes of the Sea Peoples, who invaded Egypt and the Eastern Mediterranean in the 12th century BC.

See also
Ancient regions of Anatolia
Arzawa
Assuwa
Lycians
Madduwatta

Notes

External links
 Maps of Lycia
 The Lukka, at "Sea Peoples and the Philistines on the Web"

Prehistoric Anatolia
Lycia
Hittite Empire
Sea Peoples